Philip Bernard "Peaches" O'Neill  (August 30, 1879 – August 2, 1955) was a catcher for the  Cincinnati Reds in the 1904 season. He later managed the Anderson, Indiana minor league baseball team in 1906.

External links
 

1879 births
1955 deaths
Baseball players from Indiana
Cincinnati Reds players
Major League Baseball catchers
Minor league baseball managers
Le Mars Blackbirds players
Grand Rapids Orphans players
Anderson (minor league baseball) players
Sportspeople from Anderson, Indiana
Nashville Vols players